The Liberation Day in Hungary was celebrated on 4 April. It honored the liberation of Hungary from Nazi Germany during the Siege of Budapest and the broader Budapest Offensive by the Soviet Red Army. On 4 April 1950, the Presidential Council of the Hungarian People's Republic declared Liberation Day to be the main national holiday in the socialist republic. Every year on this day, they also remembered the Soviet soldiers who fell in Hungary. The commemoration of holiday included ceremonial meetings, wreath laying ceremonies at the Memorial Stone of Heroes (Hősök emlékköve). Every 5 years, a military parade of the Hungarian People's Army would be held on Hősök tere inside the City Park in honor of the holiday, the last of which being held in 1985 in the presence of General Secretary János Kádár, Defense Minister István Oláh and a Soviet delegation led by Vasili Kuznetsov.

With the end of communism in Hungary approaching, the Council of Ministers of the Hungarian People's Republic removed the holiday from among its public holidays in 1989 and was abolished in 1991. Although not currently endorsed by the state, many public events in the capital are held, especially at Soviet war monuments such as the Soviet military memorial in Liberty Square.

See also
Victory Day (9 May)
Liberation Day (Bulgaria)
Liberation from Fascist Occupation Day
National Day of the Rebirth of Poland

External links
Liberation Day in 1957
Liberation Day in 1960
Liberation Day in 1985
1985 április 4

References 

Events in Hungary
Observances in Hungary
Public holidays in Hungary
April observances
Summer events in Hungary